Redouane Aouachria (born 10 November 1969) is an Algerian handball player. He competed in the men's tournament at the 1996 Summer Olympics.

References

1969 births
Living people
Algerian male handball players
Olympic handball players of Algeria
Handball players at the 1996 Summer Olympics
21st-century Algerian people